The 1st Life Grenadier Regiment, designation I 4, was a Swedish Army infantry regiment that traced its origins back to the 16th century. It was merged into a new regiment in 1927. The regiment's soldiers were recruited from the province of Östergötland.

History 

The regiment has its origins in fänikor (companies) raised in Östergötland in the 16th century. These units later formed Östergötland Infantry Regiment and Östergötland Cavalry Regiment which merged in 1791 and formed Life Grenadier Regiment. This regiment was split in 1816 creating 1st Life Grenadier Regiment and 2nd Life Grenadier Regiment.

The regiment was allotted in 1685. The regiment was given the designation I 4 (4th Infantry Regiment) in a general order in 1816. 1st Life Grenadier Regiment was then merged with 2nd Life Grenadier Regiment in 1928 to reform the old Life Grenadier Regiment.

Campaigns 

None

Organisation 

?

Commanding officers
Executive officers (Sekundchef) and regimental commander active at the regiment in the years 1816–1927. Sekundchef was a title used until 31 December 1974 at regiments that were part of the King's Life and Household Troops (Kungl. Maj:ts Liv- och Hustrupper). In the years 1816–1818, the Crown Prince was the regimental commander. In the years 1818–1927, His Majesty the King was the regimental commander.

Regimental commander

1816–1818: Crown Prince Charles John
1818–1844: Charles XIV John
1844–1859: Oscar I
1859–1872: Charles XV
1872–1905: Oscar II
1907–1927: Gustaf V

Executive officers (Sekundchefer)

1816–1832: C M Strömfelt
1832–1845: S von Post
1845–1848: C L von Hohenhausen
1848–1852: D M Klingspor
1852–1854: M Ahnström
1854–1858: J M Björnstjerna
1858–1871: C H Mörner
1871–1879: A G Örn
1879–1890: C A M Lagerfelt
1890–1898: P H W Reuterswärd
1898–1906: Per Henrik Edvard Brändström
1906–1914: Ernst Herman Daniel Vilhelm von Bornstedt
1914–1918: Carl Gustaf Hammarskjöld
1919–1927: Kunt Otto Hjalmar Säfwenberg

Names, designations and locations

See also
List of Swedish regiments

References 

Notes

Print

Online

Grenadier regiments of Sweden
Disbanded units and formations of Sweden
Military units and formations established in 1816
Military units and formations disestablished in 1927
1816 establishments in Sweden
1927 disestablishments in Sweden
Linköping Garrison